The Nakina River is a river in northwestern British Columbia, Canada, rising southeast of Atlin Lake and flowing generally southeast to its confluence with the Inklin River at the locality of Inklin, where the two rivers combine to form the Taku River.

A major tributary of the Nakina is the Sloko River, which runs Northeast to meet it from the area of the Llewellyn Glacier of the Juneau Icefield.

References

Rivers of British Columbia
Atlin District
Taku Plateau